Australia competed at the 1992 Winter Olympics in Albertville, France.
23 athletes competed, participating in alpine skiing, biathlon, bobsleigh, cross-country skiing, figure skating, freestyle skiing, luge, short track speed skating, and speed skating. Freestyle skiing and short-track speed skating were medal events for the first time, and Australia has competed in these events in every games since. Australia's best result at these games was seventh in the 5000 metres short-track relay.

Competitors
The following is the list of number of competitors in the Games.

Alpine skiing

Men

Men's combined

Women

Women's combined

Biathlon

Women

Bobsleigh

Paul Narracott was the first person to have represented Australia at both the Summer and Winter Olympic Games, having competed in the 100 metres at the 1984 Summer Olympics.

Cross-country skiing

Men

Curling

Curling was a demonstration sport at the 1992 Winter Olympics.

Figure skating

Freestyle skiing

This was the first time freestyle skiing was a medal event at the Winter Olympics, and Australia has competed in it in every Winter Olympics since. Aerials was a demonstration sport at these Olympics, which Kirstie Marshall participated in.

Men

Luge

Short track speed skating

This was the first time short track was a medal event at the Winter Olympics. Australia has competed in it in every games since, winning Australia's first ever medal and Australia's first gold medal. However, at these games, the unpredictable nature of short track acted against Australia, when a fall in the semi-finals denied the team a chance at the medals.

Men

Women

Speed skating

Men

See also

Australia at the Winter Olympics

References

External links 
Australia NOC
Olympic Winter Institute of Australia
"2002 Australian Winter Olympic Team Guide" PDF file
"The Compendium: Official Australian Olympic Statistics 1896-2002" Australian Olympic Committee  (Inconsistencies in sources mentioned in Wikibooks:Errata/0702234257)

Nations at the 1992 Winter Olympics
1992
O
Winter sports in Australia